Nowowiejski is a Polish surname. Notable people with the surname include:
 
 Antoni Julian Nowowiejski (1858–1941), Polish Catholic bishop
 Feliks Nowowiejski (1877–1946), Polish composer, conductor, organist, and music teacher

Polish-language surnames